Star Trek: Voyager is an American science fiction television series created by Rick Berman, Michael Piller, and Jeri Taylor. It originally aired from January 16, 1995, to May 23, 2001, on UPN, lasting for 172 episodes over seven seasons. It is the fifth series in the Star Trek franchise. Set in the 24th century, when Earth is part of a United Federation of Planets, it follows the adventures of the Starfleet vessel USS Voyager as it attempts to return home to the Alpha Quadrant after being stranded in the Delta Quadrant on the far side of the Milky Way galaxy.

Paramount Pictures commissioned the series following the termination of Star Trek: The Next Generation to accompany the ongoing Star Trek: Deep Space Nine. They wanted it to help launch UPN, their newly established network. Berman, Piller, and Taylor devised the series to chronologically overlap with Deep Space Nine and to maintain thematic continuity with elements that had been introduced in The Next Generation and Deep Space Nine. The complex relationship between Starfleet and ex-Federation colonists known as the Maquis was one such element and a persistent central theme. Voyager was the first Star Trek series to feature a female commanding officer, Captain Kathryn Janeway (Kate Mulgrew), as the lead character. Berman served as head executive producer in charge of the overall production, assisted by a series of executive producers: Piller, Taylor, Brannon Braga, and Kenneth Biller. 

Set in a different part of the galaxy from preceding Star Trek shows, Voyager gave the series' writers space to introduce new alien species as recurring characters, namely the Kazon, Vidiians, Hirogen, and Species 8472. During the later seasons, the Borg—a species created for The Next Generation—were introduced as the main antagonists. During Voyagers run, various episode novelizations and tie-in video games were produced; after it ended, various novels continued the series' narrative.

Production

Development
As Star Trek: The Next Generation ended, Paramount Pictures wanted to continue to have a second Star Trek TV series to accompany Star Trek: Deep Space Nine. The studio also planned to start a new television network, and wanted the new series to help it succeed. This was reminiscent of Paramount's earlier plans to launch its own network by showcasing Star Trek: Phase II in 1977. 

Initial work on Star Trek: Voyager began in 1993, when the seventh and final season of Star Trek: The Next Generation and the second season of Star Trek: Deep Space Nine were in production. Seeds for Voyagers backstory, including the development of the Maquis, were placed in several The Next Generation and Deep Space Nine episodes. Voyager was shot on the stages The Next Generation had used, and where the Voyager pilot "Caretaker" was shot in September 1994. Costume designer Robert Blackman decided that the uniforms of Voyagers crew would be the same as those on Deep Space Nine.

Star Trek: Voyager was the first Star Trek series to use computer-generated imagery (CGI), rather than models, for exterior space shots. Babylon 5 and seaQuest DSV had previously used CGI to avoid the expense of models, but the Star Trek television department continued using models because they felt they were more realistic. Amblin Imaging won an Emmy for Voyagers opening CGI title visuals, but the weekly episode exteriors were captured with hand-built miniatures of Voyager, its shuttlecraft, and other ships. This changed when Voyager went fully CGI for certain types of shots midway through season three (late 1996). Foundation Imaging was the studio responsible for special effects during Babylon 5s first three seasons. Season three's "The Swarm" was the first episode to use Foundation's effects exclusively. Star Trek: Deep Space Nine began using Foundation Imaging in conjunction with Digital Muse in season six. In its later seasons, Voyager featured visual effects from Foundation Imaging and Digital Muse. The digital effects were produced at standard television resolution and some have speculated that it cannot be re-released in HD format without re-creating the special effects. However, Enterprise has been released in HD, but the special effects were rendered in 480p and upscaled.

Music

Unlike The Next Generation, where composer Jerry Goldsmith's theme from Star Trek: The Motion Picture was reused, Goldsmith composed and conducted an entirely new main theme for Voyager. As done with The Next Generation and Deep Space Nine, a soundtrack album of the series' pilot episode "Caretaker" and a CD single containing three variations of the main theme were released by Crescendo Records in 1995 between seasons one and two. In 1996, the theme was also released as piano solo songbook.

In 2017, La-La Land Records issued Star Trek: Voyager Collection, Volume 1, a four-disc limited-edition release containing Goldsmith's theme music and tracks from Jay Chattaway's "Rise", "Night", the two-parter "Equinox", "Pathfinder", "Spirit Folk", "The Haunting of Deck Twelve", "Shattered", "The Void", and the two-parter "Scorpion"; Dennis McCarthy's "The 37's", the two-parter "Basics", "The Q and the Gray", "Concerning Flight", "Tinker Tenor Doctor Spy", and the two-parters "Workforce" and "Year of Hell"; David Bell's "Dark Frontier"; and Paul Baillargeon's "Lifesigns".

In 2020, Newsweek magazine said that the Voyager theme by Goldsmith, was the best of all Star Trek television series' themes. The article elaborates, "...Voyager recaptures some of the spacey ethereality of Courage's original vocal melody, while adding a deep space resonance that evoked the series' lost explorers, far from home among uncharted stars."

Behind the scenes

In August 2015, the main cast members (except Jennifer Lien, who retired from acting in 2002) appeared together onstage in Las Vegas for the 20th anniversary of Star Trek: Voyager at the 2015 Las Vegas Star Trek convention.

Robert Duncan McNeill (Paris) and Roxann Dawson (Torres) went on to direct episodes of Star Trek: Enterprise, while Jonathan Frakes, LeVar Burton, and Andrew Robinson (Garak of Deep Space Nine) all directed episodes of Star Trek: Voyager. Star Trek actors directing has been popular in this franchise, pioneered by Leonard Nimoy (famous for playing Spock in The Original Series), who got into directing and had this job for the third and fourth Star Trek theatrical films.

The sets used for USS Voyager were reused for the Deep Space Nine episode "Inter Arma Enim Silent Leges" for her sister ship USS Bellerophon (NCC-74705), both of which are Intrepid-class starships. The sickbay set of USS Voyager was also used as the Enterprise-E sickbay in the films Star Trek: First Contact and Star Trek: Insurrection. Additionally, the Voyager ready room and the engineering set were also used as rooms aboard the Enterprise-E in Insurrection.

Production of episodes ran from June/July to March/April each year, with one episode typically taking about 7 days to shoot. Shooting started at 7 am each weekday and continued until finished for the day. The pilot (first) episode, "Caretaker" took 31 days to shoot and was one of the most expensive television pilots shot at the time.

Plot overview

In the pilot episode, "Caretaker",  departs the Deep Space Nine space station on a mission into the treacherous Badlands. They are searching for a missing ship piloted by a team of Maquis rebels, which Voyagers security officer, the Vulcan Lieutenant Tuvok, has secretly infiltrated. While in the Badlands, Voyager is enveloped by a powerful energy wave that kills several of its crew, damages the ship, and strands it in the galaxy's Delta Quadrant, more than 70,000 light-years from Earth. The wave was not a natural phenomenon. In fact, it was used by an alien entity known as the Caretaker to pull Voyager into the Delta Quadrant. The Caretaker is responsible for the continued care of the Ocampa, a race of aliens native to the Delta Quadrant, and has been abducting other species from around the galaxy in an effort to find a successor. 

The Maquis ship was also pulled into the Delta Quadrant, and eventually the two crews reluctantly agree to join forces after the Caretaker space station is destroyed in a pitched space battle with another local alien species, the Kazon. Chakotay, leader of the Maquis group, becomes Voyagers first officer. B'Elanna Torres, a half-human/half-Klingon Maquis, becomes chief engineer. Tom Paris, whom Janeway released from a Federation prison to help find the Maquis ship, is made Voyagers helm officer. Due to the deaths of the ship's entire medical staff, the Doctor, an emergency medical hologram designed only for short-term use, is employed as the ship's full-time chief medical officer. Delta Quadrant natives Neelix, a Talaxian scavenger, and Kes, a young Ocampa, are welcomed aboard as the ship's chef/morale officer and the Doctor's medical assistant, respectively.

Due to its great distance from Federation space, the Delta Quadrant is unexplored by Starfleet, and Voyager is truly going where no human has gone before. As they set out on their projected 75-year journey home, the crew passes through regions belonging to various species: the barbaric and belligerent Kazon; the organ-harvesting, disease-ravaged Vidiians; the nomadic hunter race the Hirogen; the fearsome Species 8472 from fluidic space; and most notably the Borg, whose home is the Delta Quadrant, so that Voyager has to move through large areas of Borg-controlled space in later seasons. They also encounter perilous natural phenomena, a nebulous area called the Nekrit Expanse ("Fair Trade", third season), a large area of empty space called the Void ("Night", fifth season), wormholes, dangerous nebulae and other anomalies.

Voyager is the third Star Trek series to feature Q, an omnipotent alien—and the second on a recurring basis, as Q made only one appearance on Star Trek: Deep Space Nine. Starfleet Command learns of Voyagers survival when the crew discovers an ancient interstellar communications network, claimed by the Hirogen, into which they can tap. This relay network is later disabled, but due to the efforts of Earth-based Lieutenant Reginald Barclay, Starfleet eventually establishes regular contact in the season-six episode "Pathfinder", using a communications array and micro-wormhole technology.

In the first two episodes of the show's fourth season, Kes leaves the ship in the wake of an extreme transformation of her mental abilities, while Seven of Nine (known colloquially as Seven), a Borg drone who was assimilated as a six-year-old human girl, is liberated from the collective and joins the Voyager crew. As the series progresses, Seven begins to regain her humanity with the ongoing help of Captain Janeway, who shows her that emotions, friendship, love, and caring are more important than the sterile "perfection" the Borg espouse. The Doctor also becomes more human-like, due in part to a mobile holo-emitter the crew obtains in the third season which allows the Doctor to leave the confines of sickbay. He discovers his love of music and art, which he demonstrates in the episode "Virtuoso". In the sixth season, the crew discovers a group of adolescent aliens assimilated by the Borg, but prematurely released from their maturation chambers due to a malfunction on their Borg cube. As he did with Seven of Nine, the Doctor rehumanizes the children; Azan, Rebi and Mezoti, three of them eventually find a new adoptive home while the fourth, Icheb, chooses to stay aboard Voyager.

Life for the Voyager crew evolves during their long journey. Traitors Seska and Michael Jonas are uncovered in the early months ("State of Flux", "Investigations"); loyal crew members are lost late in the journey; and other wayward Starfleet officers are integrated into the crew. In the second season, the first child is born aboard the ship to Ensign Samantha Wildman; as she grows up, Naomi Wildman becomes great friends with her godfather, Neelix, and develops an unexpected and close relationship with Seven of Nine. Early in the seventh season, Tom Paris and B'Elanna Torres marry after a long courtship, and Torres gives birth to their child, Miral Paris, in the series finale. Late in the seventh season, the crew finds a colony of Talaxians on a makeshift settlement in an asteroid field, and Neelix chooses to bid Voyager farewell and live once again among his people.

Over the course of the series, the Voyager crew finds various ways to reduce their 75-year journey by up to five decades (barring any other delays they may encounter): shortcuts, in the episodes "Year of Hell", "Night" and "Q2"; technology boosts in "The Voyager Conspiracy", "Dark Frontier", "Timeless" and "Hope and Fear"; a subspace corridor in "Dragon's Teeth"; and a mind-powered push from a powerful former shipmate in "The Gift". Several other trip-shortening attempts are unsuccessful, as seen in the episodes "Eye of the Needle", "Prime Factors", "Future's End", "Course: Oblivion", and "Inside Man". After traveling for seven years, a current (yet returning) shipmate helps instigate a series of complex efforts which shortens the remainder of the journey to a few minutes in the series finale, "Endgame".

Cast

Geneviève Bujold, originally cast as Janeway, quit a day and a half into shooting the pilot "Caretaker" and was replaced by Kate Mulgrew.

Notable guest appearances

Cameos
 Prince Abdullah of Jordan (now king) played an unnamed ensign (science officer) in the episode "Investigations".
 Musician Tom Morello played Crewman Mitchell, seen when Captain Janeway asks him for directions on Deck 15, in "Good Shepherd".

Actors
Source material:
 Brad Dourif played Lon Suder in " Meld" as well as in the two-parter " Basics"
 Jason Alexander played Kurros, the spokesperson for a group of alien scholars, in "Think Tank".
 John Aniston played the Quarren Ambassador in the two-part episode "Workforce".
 Ed Begley Jr. portrayed Henry Starling, an unscrupulous 20th-century industrialist, in "Future's End" parts 1 and 2.
 Dan Butler played Steth in "Vis à Vis".
 Robert Curtis Brown portrayed Neezar, the Ledosian ambassador, in "Natural Law".
 David Clennon played Dr. Crell Moset in the episode "Nothing Human".
 Henry Darrow appears in the episodes "Tattoo" and "Basics: Part I" as Chakotay's father.
 Andy Dick plays the Emergency Medical Hologram Mark 2 on USS Prometheus in "Message in a Bottle".
 David Graf appeared as Fred Noonan, Amelia Earhart's navigator in the episode "The 37's".
 Gary Graham, who portrayed Ambassador Soval on Star Trek: Enterprise, played Ocampan community leader Tanis in the season-two episode "Cold Fire".
 Gerrit Graham played a member of the Q Continuum called Quinn in "Death Wish" who sought asylum on Voyager.
 Joel Grey played Caylem, in "Resistance".
 Lori Hallier played Riley Frazier, one of a group of former Borg drones, in "Unity".
 Dwayne "The Rock" Johnson portrayed the Pendari Champion with whom Seven of Nine and Tuvok are forced to compete in the episode "Tsunkatse".
 Alice Krige and Susanna Thompson both played the Borg Queen. Krige, who had originated the role in the movie Star Trek: First Contact, returned for Voyager's series finale; Thompson had portrayed the character earlier in the show's run. 
 Sharon Lawrence played the famous aviator Amelia Earhart in the episode "The 37's".
 Michael McKean plays a maniacal clown character in a simulation in which the crew's minds are held hostage in the episode "The Thaw".
 Virginia Madsen played Kellin, a Ramuran tracer, in "Unforgettable".
 Marjorie Monaghan played Freya, a shieldmaiden, in "Heroes and Demons".
 Leland Orser played Dejaren, an unstable hologram, in "Revulsion"
 John Savage plays Captain Rudolph Ransom of the USS Equinox, another Federation starship that Voyager encountered in the Delta Quadrant, in "Equinox" parts 1 and 2.
 Lori Petty played Noss in the episode "Gravity". Tuvok and Tom become stranded on a planet and befriend Noss, an alien stranded there many years before.
 John Rhys-Davies plays Leonardo da Vinci in Janeway's holodeck program. He appeared in "Scorpion: Part I" and "Concerning Flight".
 W. Morgan Sheppard appeared as Qatai, an alien trapped by a telepathic "pitcher plant" anomaly masquerading as Voyager's savior, in "Bliss".
 Sarah Silverman appeared as Rain Robinson, a young astronomer who finds Voyager in orbit of 20th-century Earth, in "Future's End" parts 1 and 2.
 Kurtwood Smith, who played the Federation president in Star Trek VI: The Undiscovered Country, played Annorax, a Krenim scientist who was determined to restore his original timeline, in "Year of Hell" parts 1 and 2.
 Comedian Scott Thompson played the alien Tomin in "Someone to Watch Over Me".
 Ray Walston, who appeared as Starfleet Academy groundskeeper Boothby in the Star Trek: The Next Generation episode "The First Duty", reprised the role in the episodes "In the Flesh" and "The Fight".
 Songwriter Paul Williams played Prelate Koru in "Virtuoso".
 Titus Welliver played Lieutenant Maxwell Burke in "Equinox" parts 1 and 2.
 Joseph Will played Tellis in "Muse".
 Ray Wise played Arturis in "Hope and Fear". He also had an appearance in an episode of Star Trek: The Next Generation called "Who Watches the Watchers".
 Tom Wright appeared as Tuvix in "Tuvix".

Connections with other Star Trek incarnations

Characters and races
As with other Star Trek series, the original Star Treks Vulcans, Klingons, and Romulans appear in Star Trek: Voyager. Voyager had appearances by several other races who initially appear in The Next Generation: the Q, the Borg, Cardassians, Bajorans, Betazoids, and Ferengi, along with Deep Space Nines Jem'Hadar (via hologram), as well as the Maquis resistance movement, previously established in episodes of The Next Generation and Deep Space Nine.

One notable connection between Voyager and The Next Generation appears regarding a wormhole and the Ferengi. In The Next Generation season-three episode "The Price", bidding takes place for rights to a wormhole. The Ferengi send a delegation to the bidding. When the Enterprise and Ferengi vessel each send shuttles into the wormhole, they appear in the Delta Quadrant, where the Ferengi shuttle becomes trapped. In the Voyager season-three episode "False Profits", the Ferengi who were trapped have since landed on a nearby planet, and begun exploiting the inhabitants for profit.

Actors from other Star Trek incarnations appearing on Voyager
In some cases, the actors play the same character as elsewhere, such as Dwight Schultz who plays Reginald Barclay. In other cases, the same actors play different characters.
 Michael Ansara is one of seven actors to play the same character (in his case the Klingon commander Kang) on three different Star Trek TV series—the original series ("Day of the Dove"), Deep Space Nine ("Blood Oath"), and Voyager ("Flashback").
 Vaughn Armstrong, who portrayed a wide variety of guest characters throughout the show's run, later went on to portray Admiral Forrest in Star Trek: Enterprise.
 Majel Barrett voices the ship's computer, having performed the same role in previous Star Trek series.
 LeVar Burton, who played Geordi La Forge on The Next Generation, appeared as Captain LaForge of USS Challenger in an alternate future in the episode "Timeless".
 Jeffrey Combs (Weyoun and Brunt of Deep Space Nine and Shran of Enterprise) appeared in "Tsunkatse" as Norcadian Penk.
 Leonard Crofoot, who appears in "Virtuoso" as a Qomar spectator, acted in The Next Generation episode "Angel One" and as the prototype version of Data's daughter Lal in The Next Generation episode "The Offspring".
 John de Lancie plays the mischievous Q, who also annoyed Captain Jean-Luc Picard on the Enterprise and Commander Benjamin Sisko on Deep Space Nine in the Deep Space Nine episode "Q-Less". He appeared in "Death Wish", "The Q and the Grey" and "Q2".
 Aron Eisenberg (Nog of Deep Space Nine) appeared in "Initiations" as a Kazon adolescent named Kar.
 Jonathan Frakes played Commander William Riker from The Next Generation, appearing in "Death Wish".
 Gerrit Graham, who played the Hunter in a Deep Space Nine episode called "Captive Pursuit", and later played a Q (Quinn) in the Voyager episode "Death Wish".
 J. G. Hertzler (Martok of Deep Space Nine and Klingon advocate Kolos in the Enterprise episode: "Judgement") appeared in "Tsunkatse" as an unnamed Hirogen.
 Suzie Plakson, who portrayed Dr. Selar in The Next Generation episode The Schizoid Man" as well as Ambassador K'Ehleyr, Worf's mate in "The Emissary" and "Reunion", appeared as the female Q in the episode "The Q and the Grey".
 Joseph Ruskin played a Vulcan Master in the episode "Gravity". Ruskin also played Galt in the Star Trek Original Series episode "Gamesters of Triskelion", the Klingon Tumek Deep Space Nine episodes "House of Quark" and "Looking for par'Mach in All the Wrong Places", a Cardassian informant in the Deep Space Nine episode "Improbable Cause", and a Suliban doctor in the Enterprise episode "Broken Bow".
 Dwight Schultz played Reginald Barclay on Star Trek: The Next Generation and in the film Star Trek: First Contact. He appeared in the following Voyager episodes: "Projections", "Pathfinder", "Life Line", "Inside Man", "Author, Author" and "Endgame".
 Mark Allen Shepherd also appears uncredited as Morn, alongside Quark in the pilot.
 Armin Shimerman, who portrayed Quark on Deep Space Nine, appeared in the pilot "Caretaker".
 Dan Shor, who appeared as the Ferengi Dr. Arridor in The Next Generation episode "The Price", reprised the role in Voyager episode "False Profits", having become stranded in the Delta Quadrant at the end of the Next Generation episode.
 Marina Sirtis, as Counselor Deanna Troi from The Next Generation, appears in "Pathfinder", "Life Line", and "Inside Man".
 James Sloyan portrayed Alidar Jarok (a defecting Romulan admiral) in "The Defector" and Alexander Rozhenko (Worf's son) as an adult in the future in "Firstborn", both Star Trek: The Next Generation episodes. In Star Trek: Deep Space Nine, he portrayed the Bajoran scientist Mora Pol and Odo's "father" in the episodes "The Begotten" and "The Alternate". The Star Trek: Voyager episode entitled "Jetrel" featured Sloyan as the title character.
 Kurtwood Smith, who plays Annorax in "Year of Hell", appeared in Star Trek: Deep Space 9 episode "Things Past" as a Cardassian, Thrax. Before this, he also appeared in Star Trek VI: The Undiscovered Country as the president of the Federation.
 George Takei from the Original Series reprised his role as Hikaru Sulu, who became Captain of USS Excelsior in Star Trek VI: The Undiscovered Country. He appeared in Voyager episode "Flashback", commemorating the 30th anniversary of Star Trek.
 Tony Todd, who played Worf's brother Kurn in The Next Generation episodes "Sins of the Father", "Redemption", parts 1 and 2 and the Deep Space Nine episode "Sons of Mogh", also the adult Jake Sisko in the Deep Space Nine episode "The Visitor", played an unnamed Hirogen in the Voyager episode "Prey".
 Gwynyth Walsh (B'Etor of The Next Generation and Generations) appeared in "Random Thoughts" as Chief Examiner Nimira.
 Grace Lee Whitney from Original Series reprised her role as Janice Rand in Voyager episode "Flashback", commemorating the 30th anniversary of Star Trek.

Actors from Voyager appearing on other Star Trek incarnations
 Martha Hackett (Seska) appeared as a member of the Terellian alien species in the finale of Star Trek: The Next Generation, "All Good Things..." and in the Star Trek: Deep Space Nine two-part episode "The Search" as Romulan Subcommander T'Rul.
 Robert Duncan McNeill (Paris) appeared in Star Trek: The Next Generation episode "The First Duty" as Starfleet cadet Nicolas Locarno. (The character of Locarno was used as a template for Tom Paris). He also appeared as Tom Paris in the Star Trek: Lower Decks episode "We'll Always Have Tom Paris".
 Kate Mulgrew appears again as Kathryn Janeway, promoted to vice admiral, in the 2002 film Star Trek: Nemesis a year after Voyager ended its run. Mulgrew is a main cast member, as Training Hologram Janeway, in the animated series Star Trek: Prodigy. Kate Mulgrew reprises her role in the animated series as Admiral Janeway.
 Ethan Phillips (Neelix) was featured in the Star Trek: The Next Generation episode "Ménage à Troi" as the Ferengi Farek, the Star Trek: Enterprise episode "Acquisition" as the Ferengi pirate Ulis, and in Star Trek: First Contact as an unnamed maître d' on the holodeck.
 Robert Picardo (the Doctor) guest-starred in the Star Trek: Deep Space Nine episode "Doctor Bashir, I Presume" as Dr. Lewis Zimmerman and an EMH Mark I, and made a cameo appearance in the film Star Trek: First Contact as the Enterprise-E's EMH.
 Tim Russ (Tuvok) appeared in Star Trek: The Next Generation episode "Starship Mine", the Star Trek: Deep Space Nine episodes "Invasive Procedures" and "Through the Looking Glass" (as Mirror Tuvok), and the film Star Trek: Generations, as various characters.
 Jeri Ryan reprises her role as Seven of Nine in Star Trek: Picard
Robert Beltran appears as Captain Chakotay of the USS Protostar in Star Trek: Prodigy.

List of episodes

The series consists of 172 episodes, all 45 minutes in length, excluding advertisement breaks. Four episodes, "Caretaker", "Dark Frontier", "Flesh and Blood" and "Endgame" originally aired as 90 minute episodes (excluding advertisement breaks). In syndication these four episodes are each split into two episodes (45 minutes in length).

Tie-in media

Novels

A total of 26 numbered books were released during the series' original run from 1995 to 2001. They include novelizations of the first episode, "Caretaker", "The Escape", "Violations", "Ragnarok", and novelizations of the episodes "Flashback", "Day of Honor", "Equinox" and "Endgame". Also, "unnumbered books", which are still part of the series, were released, though not part of the official release. These novels consist of episode novelizations except for Caretaker, Mosaic (a biography of Kathryn Janeway), Pathways (a novel in which the biography of various crew members, including all of the senior staff, is given); and The Nanotech War, a novel released in 2002, one year after the series' finale.

Book relaunch
A series of novels focusing on the continuing adventures of Voyager following the television series finale was implemented in 2003, much as Pocket Books did with the Deep Space Nine relaunch novel series, which features stories placed after the finale of that show. In the relaunch, several characters are reassigned while others are promoted but stay aboard Voyager. These changes include Janeway's promotion to admiral, Chakotay becoming captain of Voyager and breaking up with Seven of Nine, Tuvok leaving the ship to serve as tactical officer under William Riker, and Tom Paris's promotion to first officer on the Voyager. The series also introduces several new characters.

The series began with Homecoming and The Farther Shore in 2003, a direct sequel to the series' finale, "Endgame". These were followed in 2004 by Spirit Walk: Old Wounds and Spirit Walk: Enemy of My Enemy. Under the direction of a new author, 2009 brought forth two more additions to the series: Full Circle and Unworthy. In 2011, another book by the same author called Children of the Storm was released. Other novels—some set during the relaunch period, others during the show's broadcast run—have been published.

Video games

Three video games based specifically on Voyager were released: Star Trek: Voyager – Elite Force for PC (2000) and PS2 (2001), the arcade game Star Trek: Voyager – The Arcade Game (2002) and Star Trek: Elite Force II (2003), a sequel to Elite Force. The PS2 game Star Trek: Encounters (2006) also features the ship and characters from the show. Voyager was a graphic adventure video game developed by Looking Glass Technologies but it was cancelled in 1997. 

Star Trek: Voyager – Elite Force drew revenues of $15 million and sold roughly 300,000 units worldwide by 2003.

Reception

Broadcast history
Star Trek: Voyager launched on UPN with repeats entering into syndication. The two hour long debut "Caretaker" was seen by 21.3 million people in January 1995.
 
The series is available, Sunday through Friday evenings, on the broadcast network Heroes and Icons. It is also available for streaming in the United States on Paramount+ and Amazon Prime Video.

Critical response
In 2016, in a listing that included each Star Trek film and TV series separately, Voyager was ranked 6th by the L.A. Times. In 2017, Vulture ranked Star Trek: Voyager the 4th best live-action Star Trek television show, prior to Star Trek: Discovery. In 2019, Nerdist ranked this show the 5th best Star Trek series, in between Enterprise and Star Trek: Discovery. Also in 2019, MovieFone ranked it the fifth best live-action Star Trek series.

In 2019, CBR ranked Season 5 the 4th best season of a Star Trek show, and Season 4, the 8th best. In 2019, Popular Mechanics ranked Star Trek: Voyager the 36th best science fiction television show ever. Review aggregator Rotten Tomatoes gives the show a rating of 77% overall of the seven seasons based on 49 reviews. Metacritic gives Star Trek: Voyager a score of 66 out of 100, based on 10 critics, indicating "generally favorable reviews". In 2021, Variety ranked it the fourth best installment of Star Trek, counting series and movies together, placing it ahead of all television series to-date except the original.

Cultural influence

Voyager is notable for being the most gender-balanced Star Trek series with the first female lead character and strong female supporting characters, with a review of the different series giving Voyager the highest Bechdel test rating. Critical and scholarly accounts noted the prevalence of women in leadership roles and with scientific expertise, but also the series' adherence to the gender binary and heterosexual norms.

In an article about Voyager, Ian Grey wrote: "It was a rare heavy-hardware science fiction fantasy not built around a strong man, and more audaciously, it didn't seem to trouble itself over how fans would receive this. On Voyager, female authority was assumed and unquestioned; women conveyed sexual power without shame and anger without guilt. Even more so than Buffy, which debuted two years later, it was the most feminist show in American TV history."
 
About her years on Voyager, Kate Mulgrew said: "The best thing was simply the privilege and the challenge of being able to take a shot at the first female captain, transcending stereotypes that I was very familiar with. I was able to do that in front of millions of viewers. That was a remarkable experience—and it continues to resonate."

In 2015, astronaut Samantha Cristoforetti tweeted the line from the Voyager TV show about coffee, from the International Space Station. The station was getting a shipment of supplies which triggered a chance to say how coffee really was in the incoming spacecraft (a Dragon cargo spacecraft). The spacecraft was carrying the ISSpresso machine which really would allow coffee beverages to be made aboard the real-life Space Station. The popular tweet was accompanied by her wearing a Star Trek uniform also.

Home media
The series was released on DVD in 2004 and again in 2017. In addition to the episodes, the DVDs also include some extra videos related to the show. There was an extra bonus video with the DVD set from the store Best Buy in 2004. Voyager had releases of episodes on VHS format, such as a collectors set with a special display box for the tapes.

By the 2010s, the episodes were made available on various streaming services including the owners CBS All Access In 2016 Netflix made an agreement with CBS for worldwide distribution of all then existing 727 Star Trek episodes (including Voyager). Voyager has 172 episodes and has been reviewed as a binge watch, with the whole series taking about three months, as rate of two episodes per day on weekdays and three episodes per day on weekends. As of 2015 services known to carry the series include Netflix, Amazon Prime, Google Play, iTunes, and CBS.com. 

Star Trek: Voyager has not been remastered in high definition and there are no plans to do so, due to the costs of reassembling each episode from the film negatives and recreating visual effects.

Awards and nominations

Voyager won 20 different awards and was nominated for 70.

In 1995 for example, Jerry Goldsmith won an Emmy award for Outstanding Individual Achievement in Main Title Theme Music and the series also won an Emmy for Outstanding Individual Achievement in Special Visual Effects.

The following episodes won Emmy awards, "Caretaker", "Threshold", "Fair Trade", "Dark Frontier", and "Endgame".

Cast reunion
In the midst of the COVID-19 pandemic in May 2020, the cast of Voyager reunited for a live virtual event. The reunion broke the Stars in the House single-episode fundraising record, drawing donations totaling $19,225 for The Actors Fund's efforts to assist entertainment professionals in need during the COVID-19 pandemic. The previous Stars in the House record was set by a Glee reunion episode that raised $13,910.

Documentary
In 2021, plans for a Star Trek: Voyager documentary made news when it raised over $638,000 in the first two weeks of its Indiegogo crowdfunding campaign. The film is being produced by 455 Films which also produced the 2018 reunion documentary What We Left Behind about Star Trek: Deep Space Nine, as well as other documentaries. Production of the film started in 2020 and included cast member interviews prior to kicking off crowdfunding to take the film to full production. By the end of March 2021 they had raised over $1.2 million from over 11 thousand donators to make it the most funded crowdfunded documentary ever, and announced the name To The Journey: Looking Back At Star Trek: Voyager for the documentary, which will include HD remastered footage (pending approval from ViacomCBS). The fundraising campaign was noted for getting support from Nana Visitor, Kate Mulgrew, William Shatner, Jonathan Frakes, and others.

References

Citations

General and cited sources

External links

 
 Star Trek: Voyager at Paramount Plus
 

 Star Trek: Voyager at Memory Beta

 
1990s American drama television series
1990s American science fiction television series
1995 American television series debuts
2000s American drama television series
2000s American science fiction television series
2001 American television series endings
American adventure television series
American television spin-offs
American time travel television series
Cyborgs in television
English-language television shows
Prosthetics in fiction
Saturn Award-winning television series
Space adventure television series
Space Western television series
Voyager
Television series about being lost from home
Television series by CBS Studios
Television series created by Jeri Taylor
Television series created by Michael Piller
Television series created by Rick Berman
Television series set in the 24th century
Television series set in the future
Television shows adapted into comics
Television shows adapted into novels
Television shows adapted into video games
Television shows based on works by Gene Roddenberry
Television shows filmed in Los Angeles
UPN original programming